Xhovalin Delia is an Albanian painter, publicist and film director from Pukë, Albania who was born on 29 April 1959 and lives in Florence Italy.

Career
Xhovalin Delia was formed as an artist and received a degree in Painting at the Fine Arts Academy of Tirana in 1985. After the studies, Delia worked in an animation studio, "AFA Film Animation," as both director and painter.

1994–2013 at this period Delia continuously opened painting and visual art exhibitions in the most famous galleries in Florence, Italy. Also, Xhovalin stayed linked into the capital of Albania and continued to perform in various media like installation and video art especially at Pyramid of Tirana or International Center of Culture a Museum in Tirana, Albania.
2013 – Delia was the winner of the First Prize with his artwork in installation named Big Bang at 9th Edition like Venice Biennale at a similar competition of Florence.
1991 – Winner of first prize from the National Art Gallery of Albania.
1990– Xhovalin Delia before left Albanian was the winner of the prize from the National Animation Film Festival of Albania.

See also 
Modern Albanian art

References 
  Bksh.al

External links 
 Official page
banka-ideve.com
puka.shqiperia.com

1959 births
Living people
Albanian publishers (people)
People from Pukë
20th-century Albanian painters
21st-century Albanian painters
Albanian emigrants to Italy
Albanian film directors
University of Arts (Albania) alumni